Tiroda  Taluka alternately spelled as Tirora Taluka, is a Taluka in  subdivision of Gondia district in Maharashtra State of India.

Geographic Boundaries

References 

Talukas in Maharashtra
Gondia district